Longley is a surname, and may refer to:

Avard Longley (1823–1884), Canadian politician from Nova Scotia; served in the House of Commons 1878–82
Bernard Longley (born 1955) is the archbishop of Birmingham since 2009
Bill Longley (gunfighter) (1851–1878), American outlaw and gunfighter in the Old West
Bill Longley (speedway rider) (born 1914), Australian speedway rider
Blair Longley (b. 1950), Canadian politician and marijuana activist
Charles Thomas Longley (1794–1868), British Anglican Church priest; Archbishop of York; Archbishop of Canterbury 1862–68
Clifford Longley, English journalist and author.
Clint Longley (born 1952), American professional football player
Edna Longley (born 1940), Northern Irish literary critic
Harry Sherman Longley (1868-1944), Episcopal bishop in the United States
James B. Longley, Jr. (born 1951), American politician from Maine; U.S. representative 1995–97; son of James B. Longley (governor)
James B. Longley (1924–1980), American politician from Maine; governor of Maine 1975–79
James Longley (filmmaker), American documentary filmmaker
James Wilberforce Longley (1849–1922), Canadian journalist, judge, and politician; served in the Nova Scotia legislature
Jim Longley (born 1958), Australian accountant and politician; served in the New South Wales legislature 1986–96
John Longley (1867–1953), British Army officer
Luc Longley (born 1969), Australian professional basketball player
Michael Longley (born 1939), Northern Ireland poet
Mitch Longley (born 1965), American film and television actor
Sarah Longley (born 1975) Northern Irish painter 
Thomas James Longley (born 1989), British actor
Ty Longley (1971–2003), American guitarist and singer in the band Great White
Vicky Longley (born 1988), British actress
Victoria Longley (Australian actress) (born 1987), Australian actress